Frank Rice may refer to:

 Frank Rice (actor) (1892–1936), American actor
 Frank Rice (politician) (1845–1914), New York politician
 Frank P. Rice (1838–1923), Georgia (US) politician
 Frank J. Rice (1869–1917), Republican mayor of New Haven, Connecticut
 Franklin Pierce Rice (1852–1919), publisher, historian and antiquarian

See also
 Francis Rice (disambiguation)